Pratyush Kumar (born 1 July 1995) is an Indian cricketer. He made his Twenty20 debut for Baroda in the 2018–19 Syed Mushtaq Ali Trophy on 2 March 2019. He made his List A debut on 8 December 2021, for Baroda in the 2021–22 Vijay Hazare Trophy. He made his first-class debut on 17 February 2022, for Baroda in the 2021–22 Ranji Trophy.

References

External links
 

1995 births
Living people
Indian cricketers
Baroda cricketers
Place of birth missing (living people)